Savikoja is a village in Luunja Parish, Tartu County in eastern Estonia.

References

 

Villages in Tartu County